A list of films produced by the Marathi language film industry based in Maharashtra in the year 1962.

1962 Releases
A list of Marathi films released in 1962.

References

Lists of 1962 films by country or language
 Marathi
1962